Gaviao of Jiparana (Gavião do Jiparaná), also known as Digüt, Ikolen and Gavião do Rondônia, is the language of the Gavião of Rondônia, Brazil. It is a Tupian language of the Monde branch. It is partially intelligible with Suruí. The Zoró dialect is sometimes considered a separate language.

References

External links 
ELAR archive of Gavião and Suruí Languages in whistled and instrumental speech by Julien Meyer
ELAR archive of Language Documentation of traditional culture among the Gavião and Suruí of Rondônia by Dennis Moore

Tupian languages
Mamoré–Guaporé linguistic area